La Historia (English: The History) is the second compilation album and sixth album by Mexican-American cumbia group A.B. Quintanilla y Los Kumbia Kings and the second compilation album by Mexican-American musician A.B. Quintanilla. It was released on October 21, 2003, by EMI Latin. This album became their third number one album on the US Billboard Top Latin Albums chart.

Track listing
This track listing from Billboard.com

Chart performance

Sales and certifications

References

2003 compilation albums
Kumbia Kings compilation albums
A. B. Quintanilla albums
Albums produced by A.B. Quintanilla
Albums produced by Cruz Martínez
EMI Latin compilation albums
Spanish-language compilation albums
Albums recorded at Q-Productions